The Kuwait national beach soccer team represents Kuwait in international beach soccer competitions.  It is controlled by the Kuwait Football Association, the governing body for football in Kuwait.

Current squad
Correct as of March 2011

Coach: Jali Al Juraid

Achievements
 AFC Beach Soccer Championship Best: Nineth place
 2015
 Asian Beach Games Best: Thirteenth place
 2010

External links
 Squad

Asian national beach soccer teams
Beach Soccer